Saraswathi Vishveshwara (born 1946) is an Indian biophysicist with specialization in the area of Molecular Biophysics. She is a professor in the Molecular Biophysics Unit at the Indian Institute of Science, Bangalore. She works on computational biology and her research is primarily focused on elucidating structure-function relationships in biological systems. Using computational-mathematical techniques to understand the functioning of macromolecules such as proteins is a key aspect of her research.

Education

Saraswathi's undergraduate (B.Sc.) and post-graduate (M.Sc.) education was in Bangalore University. After she did her M.Sc in bio-chemistry, she completed her Ph.D. at the City University of New York under the guidance of David Beveridge. Her doctorate was in quantum chemistry.

Professional experience

After her doctorate Vishveshwara became a postdoctoral fellow at the Carnegie Mellon University, Pittsburgh. She worked with well-known quantum chemist and Nobel Laureate, John Pople. She returned to India and joined the Indian Institute of Science as a postdoctoral fellow in the Molecular Biophysics Unit. She became a faculty member and Professor.

Personal life
Saraswathi's husband, physicist, Dr. C.V. Vishveshwara, known as the Black Hole Man of India, passed away in 2017. Saraswathi spoke at the inaugural C. V. Vishveshwara Public Lecture series. Their daughter is physicist Smitha Vishveshwara.

References

20th-century Indian biologists
Living people
Indian molecular biologists
Indian computational chemists
Indian women molecular biologists
Scientists from Bangalore
Bangalore University alumni
Indian Institute of Science alumni
City University of New York alumni
20th-century Indian women scientists
20th-century Indian chemists
Women scientists from Karnataka
1946 births